Ashcraft is a surname. Notable people with the surname include:

 Alan E. Ashcraft Jr. (1906–1961), American politician
 Graham Ashcraft (born 1998), American baseball player
 Jillian Ashcraft, voice actress and singer
 Karen Ashcraft, American academic
 Mark H. Ashcraft (born 1949), American psychologist
 Tami Oldham Ashcraft (born 1983), American sailor and author